Trygve Byman (Andersen) (27 August 1909 – 13 November 1985) was a Norwegian sport wrestler. He was born in Gjedsjø in Ski and changed his name to Byman later in life. He won a bronze medal in Greco-Roman wrestling at the 1950 World Wrestling Championships.

References

1909 births
1985 deaths
Norwegian male sport wrestlers
World Wrestling Championships medalists
20th-century Norwegian people